Tulsipur railway station is located in Tulsipur town of Balrampur district, Uttar Pradesh. It serves Tulsipur town. Its code is TLR. It has two platforms. Passenger, DEMU, and Express trains halt here.

Trains

 Gorakhpur–Panvel Express (via Barhni)
 Lokmanya Tilak Terminus–Gorakhpur Lokmanya Express (via Barhni)
 Gorakhpur–Lokmanya Tilak Terminus Express (via Barhni)
 Gorakhpur−Badshahnagar Intercity Express
 Gorakhpur–Sitapur Express (via Barhni)
 Gorakhpur–Bandra Terminus Express (via Barhni)

References 

Lucknow NER railway division
Railway stations in Balrampur district